Inconceivable is a 2008 satirical drama about the test-tube baby industry. The film was written and directed by Mary McGuckian.

Plot
Dr. Freeman (Feore) runs a Las Vegas Assisted Reproductive Technology clinic. Eight of the nine women are inseminated and become pregnant, except Salome (Tilly) who manages to conceive naturally.

After the births, investigative journalist Tallulah (McGovern) notices a striking resemblance between the toddlers. She comes to believe that Dr. Freeman swapped donor sperm for his own. A preliminary hearing is held and the process of the nine women is recalled.

Cast
Jennifer Tilly as Salome 'Sally' Marsh 
Andie MacDowell as Charlotte 'Lottie' Louise Du Bose
Geraldine Chaplin as Frances Church-Chappel 
Elizabeth McGovern as Lesley Banks
Colm Feore as Dr. Jackson Charles 'Jack' Freeman
Kerry Fox as Kay Stephenson
Amanda Plummer as Tallulah 'Tutu' Williams
Michael Eklund as Marlon Bell
John Sessions as Finbar Darrow
Jordi Mollà as Victor - The Clinical Coordinator 
David Sutcliffe as John Du Bose
Lothaire Bluteau as Malcolm Blay
David Alpay as Mark Henderson
Donna D'Errico as Elsa Roxanne Gold
Oona Chaplin as Laura Chappel
Owen Teale as Richard Newman
Greta Scacchi (uncredited)

References

External links
 

2008 films
Films shot in the Las Vegas Valley
Films set in the Las Vegas Valley
2008 comedy-drama films
British comedy-drama films
Canadian comedy-drama films
English-language Canadian films
2000s English-language films
2000s Canadian films
2000s British films